Galdogob is a border town wholly administered by the semi-autonomous Puntland State of Somalia, and serves as the capital of the Galdogob District within the Mudug region.  The town technically straddles the disputed 1950s-era Provisional Administrative Line, as depicted on virtually all worldwide maps, from north-central Somalia. The resident Galdogob tribe is LEELKASE TANADE DAAROOD

Climate
Galdogob has a hot arid climate (Köppen BWh). The weather slowly heats up in the spring, as the April rainy season begins. Average temperatures later reach a maximum of around 41 °C over the summer period. Come September, a gradual fall chill starts to set in again.

Education

Galdogob has several academic institutions. According to the Puntland Ministry of Education, there are 25 primary schools and 5 secondary schools in the Galdogob District. Among these are Ciro, Al-Nur Galdogob, Kulmiye Galdogob and Qansaxle. Secondary schools in the area include Ain Shams and Galdogob Secondary. 
Higher learning is provided by AED informal education college, and Puntland State University [PSU].

Notable residents
 Mohammed Awale Liban – designer of the Somali flag
 Said Sheikh Samatar (1943– 24 February 2015) – scholar and writer
 Sadik Warfa – Member of the Somalia Parliament and Minister for Labour and social affairs of the Somali government

Notes

References

 https://www.facebook.com/Goldogob?fref=ts

External links
HAFZA Railway project

Populated places in Mudug